Karl Edward Weick (born October 31, 1936) is an American organizational theorist who introduced the concepts of "loose coupling", "mindfulness", and "sensemaking" into organizational studies.  He is the Rensis Likert Distinguished University Professor at the Ross School of Business at the University of Michigan.

Early life and education
Weick was born on October 31, 1936 in Warsaw, Indiana. He  earned his bachelor's degree at Wittenberg College in Springfield, Ohio in 1958. He went on to The Ohio State University earning his M.A. under the direction of Harold B. Pepinsky in 1960 and his Ph.D. under the direction of Douglas P. Crowne and Milton J. Rosenberg in 1962. Although he tried several degree programs within the psychology department, the department finally built a degree program specifically for Weick and fellow student Genie Plog called "organizational psychology".

Career

From 1962 to 1965, Weick was an assistant professor of psychology at Purdue University in Lafayette, IN. Six months after arriving at Purdue, he received a letter from John C. Flanagan congratulating him on being the 1961-62 Winner of the Best Dissertation of the Year Award in Creative Talent Awards Program sponsored by the American Institutes for Research. Weick submitted an article based on this research to The Journal of Abnormal and Social Psychology, but it was rejected by the editor, Dan Katz. In an unlikely turn of events one of the referees, Arthur R. (Bob) Cohen, wrote the editor indicating that he would like to change his appraisal of the article. This prompted Katz to reconsider the significance of the article. Finally in 1964, Weick's first article to come out of his dissertation was published.

Weick notes that while at Purdue, he was fortunate to develop close ties with faculty in the Krannert School of Management. It was William Starbuck that suggested Weick write a chapter about laboratory experiments and organizations for the first edition of James G. March's Handbook of Organizations, published in 1965. This ultimately established Weick's "identity" as an organizational psychologist.

Also in 1965, Weick moved to the University of Minnesota as an associate professor of psychology, and was promoted to full professor in 1968. In 1972, he left Minnesota to be a professor of psychology and organizational behavior in the business school at Cornell University, and in 1977 was given the title of Nicholas H. Noyes Professor of Organizational Behavior and Professor of Psychology. From 1977 to 1985, he was the editor of the Administrative Science Quarterly.

In 1984 until 1988, Weick was the Harkins and Co. Centennial Chair in Business Administration at University of Texas at Austin. Finally, he moved to the University of Michigan in 1988, where he remains as the Rensis Likert Distinguished University Professor of Organizational Behavior and Psychology.

Key contributions

Enactment 
Weick uses the term enactment to denote the idea that certain phenomena (such as organizations) are created by being talked about.

Loose coupling 
Weick's major contribution to the topic of loose coupling in an organizational context comes from his 1976 paper on "Educational Organizations as Loosely Coupled Systems" (published in the Administrative Science Quarterly), revisited in his review of subsequent uses of the concept, with JD Orton, in 1990's Loosely Coupled Systems: A Reconceptualization.

Loose coupling in Weick's sense is a term intended to capture the necessary degree of flex between an organization's internal abstraction of reality, its theory of the world, on the one hand, and the concrete material actuality within which it finally acts, on the other. A loose coupling is what makes it possible for these ontologically incompatible entities to exist and act on each other, without shattering (akin to Castoriadis's idea of 'articulation'). Orton and Weick argue in favour of uses of the term which consciously preserve the dialectic it captures between the subjective and the objective, and against uses of the term which 'resolve' the dialectic by folding it into one side or the other.

Sensemaking 
People try to make sense of organizations, and organizations themselves try to make sense of their environment. In this sense-making, Weick pays attention to questions of ambiguity and uncertainty, known as equivocality in organizational research that adopts information processing theory. Because the definition of equivocality is uncertainty, Weick's study in sensemaking is an effort to reduce multiple interpretations. Within his research, Weick studies requisite variety and how organizations can achieve it by having a "most single" reality. His contributions to the theory of sensemaking include research papers such as his detailed analysis of the breakdown of sensemaking in the case of the Mann Gulch disaster, in which he defines the notion of a 'cosmology episode' - a challenge to assumptions that causes participants to question their own capacity to act.

In Weick's first book, The Social Psychology of Organizing, he lists seven properties of organizational sensemaking: identity, retrospect, enactment, social contact, ongoing events, cues, and plausibility. This categorization of thought is the human mind's attempt to understand information.

Mindfulness 
Weick introduced the term mindfulness into the organizational and safety literatures in the article Organizing for high reliability: Processes of collective mindfulness (1999).  Weick develops the term “mindfulness” from Langer's (1989) work, who uses it to describe individual cognition.  Weick's innovation was transferring this concept into the organizational literature as “collective mindfulness.”  The effective adoption of collective mindfulness characteristics by an organization appears to cultivate safer cultures that exhibit improved system outcomes.  The term high reliability organization (HRO) is an emergent property described by Weick (and Karlene Roberts at UC-Berkeley).  Highly mindful organizations characteristically exhibit: a) Preoccupation with failure, b) Reluctance to simplify c) Sensitivity to operations, d) Commitment to Resilience, and e) Deference to Expertise.

Weick explained that mindfulness is when we realize our current expectations, continuously improve those expectations based on new experiences, and implement those expectations to improve the current situation into a better one.

Organizational information theory
Organizational information theory builds upon general systems theory, and focuses on the complexity of information management within an organization. It is sometimes also called Information Systems Theory. The theory addresses how organizations reduce equivocality, or uncertainty through a process of information collection, management and use. However, the goal of Weick was not to eradicate ambiguity, rather work alongside it, because it is a necessary aspect of growth. His structuring of his research was purposefully complex and ambiguous because Weick believed you cannot impose order on a world that is constantly spiraling toward entropy. While in this is strong reasoning, it makes it difficult for individuals to learn and teach this complex theory. This ambiguity creates a cycle of irony, as Weick's goal is to reduce ambiguity within organizations.

Organizational Information theory analyzes how information and sense-making varies from person to person because it is perceptual in nature. Essentially, this theory seeks to answer how people make sense of information in an environment. Weick specifies that environment is not limited to a physical space, but expands into informational realms, especially in reaction to the development of the internet. As information on the internet becomes easily accessible and its consumption increases, the need for this theory is more prominent. Organizations and individuals are constantly acting and reacting in patterns that align with this theory. Its complexity mirrors the humanistic nature of society, and is continuously evolving just as the human race is.

Plagiarism 

In several published articles, Weick related a story that originally appeared in a poem by Miroslav Holub, “Brief thoughts on maps”, in which soldiers lost in the Alps find their way with an old map, revealed at the end to be a map of the Pyrénées. The original poem was published in the Times Literary Supplement, February 4, 1977. Weick republished the poem with minor differences, sometimes without quotation or attribution. The plagiarism was detailed in an article by Thomas Basbøll and Henrik Graham.

Weick has disputed the claim of plagiarism in a response. Basbøll and Graham later remarked that Weick's defense violates some of the assumptions of his theory of sensemaking, also noting: “The American Historical Association acknowledges the existence of this common defence in specific cases of plagiarism, tersely remarking that it “is plausible only in the context of a wider tolerance of shoddy work.”

Publications 
Books
 1969, The Social Psychology of Organizing (first edition), Addison-Wesley Pub.
 1979, The Social Psychology of Organizing (Second edition), McGraw Hill.
 1995, Sensemaking in Organizations, Sage.
 2001, Making Sense of the Organization (Volume 1), Blackwell.
 2001, Managing the Unexpected: Assuring High Performance in an Age of Complexity. with co-author Kathleen M. Sutcliffe, Jossey-Bass.
 2007, Managing the Unexpected: Resilient Performance in an Age of Uncertainty. with co-author Kathleen M. Sutcliffe, Jossey-Bass.
 2009, Making Sense of the Organization (Volume 2) The Impermanent Organization, Blackwell.

Articles
 1976, "Educational Organizations as Loosely Coupled Systems." Administrative Science Quarterly 21:1-19.
 1984, with Richard L Daft, "Toward a model of organizations as Interpretation systems". Academy of Management. The Academy of Management Review (pre-1986); 9; pg. 284; Apr 1984.
 1988, "Enacted Sensemaking in Crisis Situation", in: Journal of Management Studies. 25:4, pp. 305–317, July, 1988.
 2005, with Kathleen M. Sutcliffe and, David Obstfeld, "Organizing and the Process of Sensemaking", in: Organization Science. Vol. 16, nº 4, p. 409-421, Jul/Aug, 2005.

References

External links 

 Leadership When Events Don't Play By the Rules Short essay by Weick
 Complicate Yourself interview with Weick in Wired, April 1996
 The Collapse of Sensemaking in Organisations - The Mann-Gulch Disaster

1936 births
American business theorists
American organizational theorists
Living people
Ross School of Business faculty
Wittenberg University alumni
Ohio State University alumni
Mindfulness movement